Sawayama (stylized in all caps) is the debut studio album by Japanese-British singer-songwriter Rina Sawayama, released on 17 April 2020 by the independent record label Dirty Hit. A follow up to her self-released debut EP Rina (2017), it received widespread acclaim from music critics, specifically towards the wide variety of music genres used, as well as its Y2K nostalgia and "intelligent" nature. Described by Sawayama herself as being "about family and identity", she lyrically explores personal experiences from both her childhood and adulthood.

Sawayama was primarily produced by Clarence Clarity and written by Sawayama, with additional work from musicians such as Danny L Harle, Kyle Shearer, Jonathan Gilmore, Bram Inscore and Lauren Aquilina among others. Musically, the album is influenced by 2000s mainstream pop, nu metal, rock, R&B, and dance-pop among other genres.

Background and composition 
Sawayama was recorded in London and Los Angeles. The artist herself stated in a press release that the album "is about family and identity. It's about understanding yourself in the context of two opposing cultures (for me British and Japanese), what "belonging" means when home is an evolving concept, figuring out where you sit comfortably within and awkwardly outside of stereotypes, and ultimately trying to be ok with just being you, warts and all."

Musically, Sawayama is produced, performed and recorded in a wide variety of genres. Primarily influenced by 2000s mainstream pop, nu metal, rock, R&B, and dance-pop, it also was noted by critics to include elements of arena rock, EDM, avant-pop, hyperpop, electro, art pop, house, hair metal, hip-hop, experimental, synth-pop, bubblegum pop, emo pop, grunge, industrial, dubstep, country pop, pop rock, gospel, glam rock, trap, trip hop, folk, J-pop and electro-dub.

Promotion

Singles 
"STFU!" was released as the lead single to the then-unannounced album on 21 November 2019. It is a nu metal track and represents a change in direction for Sawayama. The song premiered alongside the music video, which was co-directed by Ali Kurr and Sawayama herself. The single was met with critical acclaim, achieving a score of 82 on the website Album Of The Year (based on both Critic and User reviews). It was inspired by "a cascade of microaggressions" with a message that "Asian women should not be cast as quiet and subservient."

"Comme des Garçons (Like the Boys)" was released as the second single to the album, along with the album pre-order, on 17 January 2020. It is a dance track written about female empowerment and the "rejection of traditional masculinity" by gay men. A remix of the track was released a month later, on 21 February 2020, featuring Brazilian drag queen Pabllo Vittar and a new mix by Brabo. A music video featuring the original mix of the song was released on 26 February 2020.

"XS" was released as the album's third official single on 2 March 2020. Sawayama stated that the track "is a song that mocks capitalism in a sinking world. Given that we all know global climate change is accelerating and human extinction is a very real possibility within our lifetime it seemed hilarious to me that brands were still coming out with new makeup palettes every month and public figures were doing a gigantic house tour of their gated property in Calabasas in the same week as doing a 'sad about Australian wildfires' Instagram post." This song received positive reviews, with Sofia Meyers of Euphoria stating that "if this is the direction she is going in, we're all in for what's next." A music video for the track was released on 17 April 2020. On 10 July 2020, the remix of the song came out in collaboration with the musician Bree Runway, with the difference that the introduction is a little different from the original and the verse from Bree Runway replaces the second from the original version.

"Chosen Family" was released as the album's fourth single on 3 April 2020. Prior to the single's release, Sawayama leaked its chords and lyrics so that fans create their own versions of the track. She also released a video featuring her favourite fan made versions of the track as well as a tutorial of how to play the song on the guitar.

"Bad Friend" was released as the fifth single from the record on 15 April 2020, two days before the album's release. Sawayama herself has described the track as her favourite from the album and stated that it was written after she found out through social media that her formerly close friend had just had a baby. The music video was released in May.

Tour

In January 2020, Sawayama announced through her social media The Dynasty Tour, her second concert series, with dates in North America and Europe. Due to safety concerns over the COVID-19 pandemic, the tour dates were rescheduled to 2021. The tour began on 8 November, 2021, in Dublin, Ireland at The Academy, and concluded on 13 May, 2022, in New York City at Terminal 5. The setlist mostly consisted of songs from the album and Sawayama's 2017 Rina EP. American singer and DJ Hana and London-based singer Ama Jones served as opening acts for the first leg of the tour.

{{Hidden
| headercss = background: #DCDCDC; font-size: 100%; width: 100%;  
| contentcss = text-align: left; font-size: 100%; width: 100%; 
| header = Set list
| content =
This set list is from the concert on 9 November 2021 in Manchester, England. It is not intended to represent all shows from the tour.

"Dynasty"
"STFU!"
"Comme des Garçons (Like the Boys)"
"Akasaka Sad"
"Snakeskin"
"Cyber Stockholm Syndrome"
"Paradisin'"
"Love Me 4 Me"
"Bad Friend"
"Fuck This World"
"Who's Gonna Save U Now?"
"Tokyo Love Hotel"
"Chosen Family"
"Cherry"
Encore
"XS"
"Lucid"
"Free Woman"

}}

Critical reception 

Sawayama garnered widespread critical acclaim from music critics and listeners alike. At Metacritic, which assigns a normalised rating out of 100 based on reviews from mainstream critics, the album received a score of 89 out of 100, based on reviews from 14 critics, indicating "universal acclaim". The album was rated an 8.3 out of 10 on the aggregator AnyDecentMusic?.

The Line of Best Fit writer Erin Bashford called it a "deftly intelligent record [that] takes personal and musical themes, and presents them in a way that doesn't feel like it's ever been done before". She also praised Sawayama's "strong and emotional vocals" and "tak[ing] motifs and styles from every genre and era and curat[ing] something that feels futuristic", summing up her review by stating "Rina Sawayama is one-of-a-kind, and her debut album certainly isn't going to be quiet about that". NME complimented Sawayama for being "an exciting first step from an artist unafraid to push pop into new realms". Writing for Pitchfork, Katherine St. Asaph described Sawayama as "a Y2K flashback that’s as reverent of Evanescence and Korn as it is of Britney and Christina." In June 2020, Elton John called the album "the strongest album of the year so far" and regarded the song "Bad Friend" as one that "Madonna would die for." Tom Hull was less impressed, giving it a B-minus and saying the "music aims for arena rock, sometimes with a bit of dissonance, but that doesn't help either."

Year-end lists

Track listing 

Sample credit
"Snakeskin" samples Japanese video game Final Fantasy IVs "Fanfare", composed by Nobuo Uematsu (1991).

Personnel 
Credits adapted from the album's liner notes.

Musicians
 London Community Gospel Choir – choir vocals 
 Adam Hann – additional guitars 
 Freddy Sheed – additional drums 

Artwork
 Ben Ditto – creative direction
 Hendrik Schneider – photography
 Samuel Burgess-Johnson – layout
 Jack Westall – "Remixed" artwork

Technical
 Spike Stent – mixing 
 Tim Rowkins – mixer 
 Robin Schmidt – mastering
 Joseph Rodgers – additional engineering 
 Jonathan Gilmore – additional engineering 
 Chloe Kraemer – additional engineering

Charts

Sawayama Remixed

Sawayama Remixed is a remix extended play by Japanese-British singer-songwriter Rina Sawayama. The limited edition set was released on 12-inch vinyl on 27 November 2020 via Rough Trade. The remixes of "XS" and "Comme des Garçons (Like the Boys)" had previously been released as singles earlier in the year and Sawayama's cover of "Dance in the Dark" was released as part of her Spotify Singles series.

Track listing

Release history

References

2020 debut albums
Rina Sawayama albums
Dirty Hit albums
Albums produced by Clarence Clarity
Albums produced by BloodPop
Albums produced by Danny L Harle
Avant-pop albums
Dance-pop albums by English artists
Dance-pop albums by Japanese artists
Electronic dance music albums by English artists
Electronic dance music albums by Japanese artists
Rock albums by English artists
Rock albums by Japanese artists